Juana Manuel (1339 – 27 March 1381) was Queen of Castile from 1369 until 1379 by marriage to king Henry II of Castile. She was also the heiress of Escalona, Villena, Peñafiel and Lara, as well as Lady of Biscay.

Family 

She was the daughter of Juan Manuel, Prince of Villena (1282–1348) and his second wife Blanca Núñez de Lara de La Cerda. Her mother Blanca (d. 1347) was a descendant of the lords of Biscay and of Lara and of Alfonso X's eldest son, Fernando de la Cerda. She was the last legitimate member of the House of Ivrea.

Marriage 

Her father had been for five years a serious enemy of King Alfonso XI of Castile, his former protégé, and the king wished to neutralize or absorb the might of the Peñafiel family. Although Juana was not yet the heiress (yet), already in her youth she had to go along with royal wishes. The king's influential mistress, Leonor de Guzmán, wanted to obtain some high prestige and property to her eldest son.

On 27 July 1350 her brother and guardian, Fernando Manuel of Peñafiel, had to marry his young sister to Henry (1333–1379), eldest of the illegitimate sons of Alfonso XI. This brought Henry certain lands.

However it was later that Juana's relatives' deaths made Juana the great heiress she turned out to be, while her husband became a threat to the royal power.

Inheritance and queenship
In 1361 (at the death of her teenage niece Blanca, daughter of her brother Fernando Manuel who himself had died in c 1350 without other children) she inherited Villena, Escalona and Peñafiel.

Because Juana was a maternal granddaughter of La Palomilla (Juana Núñez de Lara), from her another cousin, Isabel de Lara who was murdered in 1361  and her young daughter Florentina  (d after 1365), she also inherited Lara and Biscay.

In 1369, her husband became King Henry II of Castile, after he deposed and murdered his half-brother to take the throne, and she became queen of Castile and León.

When in 1381 she died and left her inheritance to her son, Biscay finally was united with Castile, and ultimately Spain.

Issue

King John I of Castile (1358–1390)
Eleanor (died 1416)
Joanna

Family tree

References 

1339 births
1381 deaths
Castilian queen consorts
Leonese queen consorts
Galician queens consort
Juama Manuel
Juana Manuel
14th-century Castilians
Castilian infantas
14th-century Spanish women
Queen mothers